María Lourdes Pía Luisa Alcorta Suero (born June 21, 1951, in Lima) is a Peruvian author, social communicator, Fujimorist politician and a former Congresswoman representing Lima from 2006 to 2019.

Early life 
She graduated from Colegio Sagrado Corazón Sophianum school, in San Isidro, and studied advertising and marketing at Pontificia Universidad Católica del Perú.
Alcorta worked in the private sector until 2003: she started as a television producer, then became accountancy director for the advertising agencies "Peruana de Publicidad" and "Forum"; she would later form her own agency, "Alma Publicidad". 
Also, she worked as a public speaker in advertising and marketing seminars, and has recently participated in governance, national security, and death penalty for child rapists seminars.

Political career 
In 2013, she resigned from the Christian People's Party and from the Alliance for the Great Change, and joined the Regional Union group, and is elected councillor of Lima's San Isidro District. In 2006, she is elected to Congress for the 2006–2011 term on the National Unity list. In the 2011 election, she is re-elected for another five-year term on the ticket of the Alliance for the Great Change, to which the Christian democrats now belong. In the 2016 election, she was re-elected for another five-year term this time on the Fujimorist Popular Force and left office in 2019 following to the dissolution of the Congress.

References

External links

Lourdes Alcorta's personal site
Official Congressional Site
Resume on the National Electoral Committee (JNE) site

Living people
Peruvian people of Spanish descent
Christian People's Party (Peru) politicians
Members of the Congress of the Republic of Peru
1951 births
21st-century Peruvian women politicians
21st-century Peruvian politicians
Fujimorista politicians
National Unity (Peru) politicians
Women members of the Congress of the Republic of Peru